, referred to as  , is a private railway company operating around Aichi Prefecture and Gifu Prefecture of Japan. 

Some of the more famous trains operated by Meitetsu include the Panorama Car and the Panorama Car Super, both of which offer views through their wide front windows. While the Panorama Super train is used extensively for the railroad's limited express service, the older and more energy-consuming Panorama Car train has been retired, the last run being on 27 December 2008.

In the Tōkai region around Nagoya, it is a central firm of the Meitetsu Group, which is involved in the transportation industry, the retail trade, the service industry, and the real estate industry, etc.

Meiji Mura is the corporate museum of Meitetsu.

As of March 31, 2010, Meitetsu operated  of track, 275 stations, and 1,090 train cars.

Lines

Major stations

Major stations in Nagoya
NH36 : Meitetsu Nagoya Station
NH34 : Kanayama Station
NH33 : Jingū-mae Station
ST01 :

Nagoya Line (east side) and Toyokawa Line
NH01 : Toyohashi Station (Toyohashi)
NH13 : Higashi Okazaki Station (Okazaki)
NH17 : Shin Anjō Station (Anjō)
NH19 : Chiryū Station (Chiryū)
NH23 : Zengo Station (Toyoake)
TK04 : Toyokawa-inari Station (Toyokawa)

Tokoname Line, Chikkō Line, and Airport Line
TA09 : Ōtagawa Station (Tokai)
TA12 : Asakura Station (Chita)
TA22 : Tokoname Station (Tokoname)
TA24 : Central Japan International Airport Station

Kōwa Line and Chita New Line
KC08 : Agui Station (Agui)
KC12 : Chita Handa Station (Handa)
KC16 : Chita Taketoyo Station (Taketoyo)
KC19 : Kōwa Station (Mihama)
KC24 : Utsumi Station (Minami Chita)

Mikawa Line, Toyota Line, Nishio Line, and Gamagōri Line
MY07 : Toyotashi Station (Toyota)
TT06 : Nisshin Station (Nisshin)
MU02 : Kariya Station (Kariya)
MU06 : Mikawa Takahama Station (Takahama)
MU10 : Hekinan-chūō Station (Hekinan)
GN10 : Nishio Station (Nishio)
GN13 : Kira Yoshida Station
GN22 : Gamagōri Station (Gamagōri)

Nagoya Line (west side), Takehana Line, and Hashima Line
NH42 : Sukaguchi Station (Kiyosu)
NH47 : Kōnomiya Station (Inazawa)
NH50 : Meitetsu Ichinomiya Station (Ichinomiya)
NH56 : Kasamatsu Station (Kasamatsu)
NH60 : Meitetsu Gifu Station (Gifu)
TH07 : Hashima-shiyakusho-mae Station (Hashima)

Tsushima Line and Bisai Line
TB01 : Jimokuji Station (Ama)
TB07 : Tsushima Station (Tsushima)
TB09 : Saya Station (Aisai)
TB11 : Yatomi Station (Yatomi)
BS06 : Morikami Station
BS23 : Okuchō Station

Inuyama Line, Kakamigahara Line, and Hiromi Line
IY03 : Kami Otai Station
IY04 : Nishiharu Station (Kitanagoya)
IY07 : Iwakura Station (Iwakura)
IY10 : Kōnan Station (Kōnan)
IY15 : Inuyama Station (Inuyama)
IY17 : Shin Unuma Station
KG06 : Mikakino Station
KG08 : Kakamigahara-Shiyakusho-mae Station (Kakamigahara)
HM06 : Shin Kani Station (Kani)
HM10 : Mitake Station (Mitake)

Komaki Line
KM06 : Komaki Station (Komaki)
KM13 : Kami Iida Station

Seto Line
ST06 : Ōzone Station
ST15 : Owari Asahi Station (Owariasahi)
ST20 : Owari Seto Station (Seto)

Rolling stock

Nippon Sharyo has produced nearly every car that Meitetsu operates or has operated, a notable exception being its DeKi 600, an electric locomotive, which was produced by Toshiba, but very few units were produced for Meitetsu. The DeKi 600 is one of the few locomotives that Meitetsu possesses: while the company used to engage in the freight business and still possesses some freight locomotives, it no longer carries freight on a regular basis.

Meitetsu is famous for its red trains, including its famous 7000 series "Panorama Car" which was retired in 2009 after a career lasting nearly half a century. The most recent cars, however, are not solid red but rather brushed steel as in the case of the 4000 series and 5000 series, or white as in the case of the 1700 series and 2000 series.

The following are the train types that Meitetsu operates today, as well as selected types that Meitetsu has retired.

Limited express
 1200 and 1230 series "Panorama Super"
 1800/1850 series
 2000 series "μ-Sky"
 2200/2300 series

Commuter

 100/200 series
 300 series
 3100/3500/3700 series
 3150 series
 3300 series
 4000 series
 5000 series (2008)
 6000/6500/6800 series
 9100/9500 series

Withdrawn train types

 1380 series
 1600 series "Panorama Super"
 1700 series
 7000 series "Panorama Car"
 5000 series (1955)
 5300/5700 series

Electric locomotives
 Meitetsu DeKi 300
 Meitetsu DeKi 400
 Meitetsu DeKi 600
 Meitetsu Class EL120

History 
While Meitetsu is an old company in its own right, it has over time acquired many small railway and interurban companies in the area surrounding Nagoya. Meaning many lines that belong to modern-day Meitetsu were constructed and operated by other companies, mostly in the prewar and wartime period. For example, it acquired its Kōwa Line on the Chita Peninsula from its merger with Chita Railroad on February 1, 1943 and it acquired its Mikawa Line from its merger with Mikawa Railroad.

References

External links

Nagoya Railroad (English Official Site)
Nagoya Railroad (Japanese Official Site)
Museum Meiji Village

Companies listed on the Tokyo Stock Exchange
 
Companies based in Nagoya
Japanese companies established in 1921
Railway companies established in 1921